Zivar Mammadova (14 June 1902 – 22 April 1980) was an Azeri sculptor, known as the first woman sculptor of Azerbaijan. She was the mother of the notable Azeri sculptor Tokay Mammadov.

Life 
Zivar Mammadova, the first Azeri woman sculptor, was born in Baku into the family of the businessman Najafgulu Tagiyev. She entered her first secondary school, Saint Nina Girls' Gymnasium, at the age of seven. After obtaining her diploma she joined the painting course at the Baku School of Sculpture. After qualifying she continued her further education at the Azerbaijan Higher Art School and the State Turkish Music School, at which she played the violin and engaged in the fine arts. In 1920 she entered the Baku Higher Art School, where she qualified in 1924.

After qualifying, she worked for a time for Stepan Erzia, and then in the workshop of Pinxos Sabsay. As an artist she became known for her portraits and created an extensive body of work, including a bust of Huseynqulu Sarabsky during his student years and later a series of illustrations of the works of Mahsati Ganjavi and Nizami Gəncəvi. She also sculpted the image of her favourite teacher Azim Azimzade for the monument on his tomb in the Avenue of Honour in Baku.

Zivar Mammadova was one of the first creators of Azeri national sculpture. She performed an excellent job in creating artistic images and portraits of persons who had an important role in developing Azeri culture, literature and music.

She is notable not only as the female sculptor in the history of Azeri culture but also as a professional violinist. She attended the conferences of the eminent educator Uzeyir Hajibeyov, played the violin in the State Symphony Orchestra, created and directed by the composer in 1922, and was a key performer in the first performance of the opera "Arşın mal alan" in 1923.

Works
Mammadova created many portrait sculptures of leading personalities. In 1930–40 these included Azim Azimzade (gesso bust), Huseynqulu Sarabski (bust), Meshadi Azizbayov and Bəsti Bağırova, heroes of the Soviet Union, Idris Suleymanov and other famous people. In 1950 she produced a statue in gesso of the prominent composer Uzeyir Hajibeyli (as it turned out, the only known portrait of him). Others of her works were "Collective Woman" (gesso, 1940), "Girl with a husband" (decorative figurine, porcelain, 1950), "Ballerina" (decorative figurine, porcelain with gold highlights, 1954) and other figurines of ballerinas from the opera "Koroglu" by Hajibeyov.

References

Bibliography
 Клюева И.В. Художественно-педагогическая деятельность Степана Эрьзи. — Саранск: Издательство Мордовского университета, 2007. — 202 с.
 Мәммәдова (азерб.) // Азербайджанская советская энциклопедия / Под ред. Дж.Кулиева. — Б.: Главная редакция Азербайджанской советской энциклопедии, 1982. — C. VI. — S. 508.

1902 births
1980 deaths
Azerbaijani women sculptors
Artists from Baku
Azerbaijani women artists
20th-century Azerbaijani sculptors
20th-century Azerbaijani women artists
Soviet sculptors